Shuffle and Go is the twenty-ninth studio album by British folk rock band Fairport Convention, released in January 2020. It was their last to feature drummer Gerry Conway who left the group in 2022.

Recording and release
Recording for the album took place at Woodworm Studios in October 2019. The album was released via the band's website in time for their winter tour which began in January 2020, where the album was available to buy from the merchandise table at every show. The album then got an official release on 28 February 2020 from all other retailers and platforms.

Critical reception
John Barlass of At The Barrier called Shuffle and Go "a most enjoyable piece of work" and David Kidman of Folk Radio also gave the album praise, calling it "another solid, and solidly desirable, entry in the Fairport canon."

Track listing
 "Don't Reveal My Name" (Chris Leslie) – 3:59
 "Cider Rain" (James Wood, Luc Boisseau, Philippe Richalley) – 3:43
 "Good Time for a Fiddle and Bow / The Christmas Eve Reel" (Leslie, Tommy Coen) – 4:20
 "A Thousand Bars" (Rob Beattie) – 5:29
 "Shuffle and Go" (Leslie) – 3:14
 "Moses Waits" (Beattie) – 4:20
 "Steampunkery" (Ric Sanders) – 3:42
 "Linseed Memories" (James Wood) – 3:30
 "The Year of Fifty Nine" (Leslie) – 3:24
 "The Byfield Steeplechase" (PJ Wright) – 3:51
 "Moondust and Solitude" (Leslie) – 5:30
 "Jolly Springtime" (James Taylor) – 2:00
 "Precious Time" (Sanders) – 5:29

Personnel
Fairport Convention
Simon Nicol – vocals, acoustic guitar, electric guitar
Dave Pegg – vocals, bass guitar, ukulele, bass ukulele, mandolin
Chris Leslie – vocals, mandolin, violin, acoustic guitar, harmonica, bouzouki, whistle, kalimba, Celtic harp, ukulele 
Ric Sanders – violin, keyboards, ukulele, bass ukulele
Gerry Conway – drums, percussion

See also
List of 2020 albums

References

Fairport Convention albums
2020 albums
Albums produced by John Gale
Matty Grooves albums